is a Japanese anime short series created by Shuichi Oshida, considered as a parody of Go Nagai's Mazinger Z. The series is produced by both Bee Train and Synergy Japan and began airing in Kids Station on April 12, 2004 to November 1, 2004.

Theme
Panda-Z: The Robonimation includes characters that were modeled after the main cast of Mazinger Z. None of the characters are voiced, and the show's infrequent dialogue is instead presented through intertitles. Some episodes have no dialogue at all, relying on mime movement, sound effects, and the show's electric guitar-based blues/rock/fusion soundtrack for expression. Each episode is five minutes long, including both the opening and ending credits. The ending credits also include a profile of one character or set piece from the series.

Story
The series consists of short comedy sketches, involving the adventures of Pan-Taron, a super deformed robotic panda, pilot of the Panda-Z mecha, and his equally small cute robotic friends, as they fight the evil Skullpander, leader of the Warunimal forces. The story is confined to the small Robonimal Island (containing Robonimal City and P-Z Labs) and a tiny nearby volcanic island that is home to the Warunimal base. Buildings in Robonimal City are all topped with panda heads.

Never taking itself seriously, the story is often just an excuse to put the characters in common everyday situations, but with a robotic twist, which allows for comical results.

In several episodes the characters can be seen playing the card game Old Maid against one another. The deck they play with has characters from the show on them, including Skullpander as the Joker. In one episode they play Rock-Paper-Scissors...a game made more difficult by their mitten-like hands. Being robots, they can often be seen ingesting batteries for their food. Some other times, the struggle between the two groups is present, but either one of them, or sometimes even both, don't take the fighting seriously.

Characters

Robonimal Island
  - Pilot of the Panda-Z.
  - Taron's grandfather and the director of the laboratory. He is a researcher at the mysterious "Super P-Z" and an authority on Robonimal engineering. He created the Panda-Z along with Taron's father (who left one day years ago and never returned). But outside of that, he is just a kind grandfather, who loves his grandson very much.
  - A pink robot rabbit with angel wings and a white nurse's outfit. She dreams of becoming a great nurse someday. She has a cheerful, kind personality and also has a strong sense of responsibility.
  - He is something of a leader in Taron's group of friends. Denwan is dependable, but sometimes, he gets ahead of himself and ends up failing. His dream is to become a great public Denwan someday. ( is Japanese for "telephone" and Wanwan is the sound a dog makes so he is basically a telephone dog.) He is, however, a pay phone, requiring others to pay him to make an outgoing call. Also, his dial only has seven digits.
  - He is a brilliant and talented scholar. Sometimes, he can be timid and a bit of a scaredy-cat, but he dreams of becoming a researcher at the Panda-Z Lab someday.  His name seems to be a pun on "techie" and "monkey", and is a yellow robot monkey.
  - A green robot that is a cross between an elephant and a tank, with a cannon for a trunk. ( is Japanese for "elephant".) It seems to be an independent character, rather than merely a vehicle. However, it's large enough for other Robonimals to ride in.
  - The rescue professionals at the Panda-Z lab:
  - A white bear with red rescue flasher ears and a doctor's speculum (mirror headband). Rabinna is his nurse.
  - Basically the fire fighter of the group.
  - A pair of nearly identical bear robots, with "01" or "02" on their ears. They're litter-bearers, among other tasks.
They are both incredible mechanics and Panda-Z's feats are often made possible thanks to these two. They pilot the Ham Gears, giant robots that let them repair Panda-Z at its own scale, as well as carry a damaged Panda-Z off the battlefield. There seems to be no relation between the noncombatant Ham Gears and Dr. Jangarly's Black Ham Gear.

Warunimals
  - Leader of the Warunimals, what's beneath his cloak is a source of mystery to his own generals. He is spooky and mysterious and rarely seems to do anything, generally staying in his cloud-wreathed island headquarters.
  - A Warunimal general with a cow-like appearance. Mougyu is probably Taron's most frequent opponent. He is often cheated of victory because his remote control breaks, or he is injured when he gets dragged along behind it on the remote's cable. Mougyu's giant robot  uses a large hammer.
  - A robo-hamster with a mustache and  a clear dome skull that shows his computer brain. When he smokes, the smoke fills his dome and he shorts out. His giant robot  is not completed until the end of the series, and he frequently threatens dire vengeance once it is ready.
  - A robot wolf who is perhaps a little too domesticated, sometimes playing fetch when he should be fighting. Normally light gray, he turns red under a full moon. His giant wolf robot  has a set of "bone nunchaku".
  - A rabbit-princess with adult proportions (as opposed to the child-body proportions of everyone else). Her giant robot  occasionally demonstrates the ability to act on its own, and at one point seems to fall in love with Panda-Z.
  - A giant robotic rooster, apparently an unpiloted Warunimal asset. It can launch egg bombs, fly, and is assisted by smaller flying robot roosters. Its name is derived from the sound of a rooster's crowing.
  - Identical masked minions who wear four color schemes to denote which general they follow: yellow for Mougyu, black for Jangarly, light gray for Wolgar, and pink for Rubyraby. They do not seem to like their generals and sometimes argue amongst each other which group has it the worst.
  - A box on legs with panda features that serves as Rubiraby's pet.

Episodes
Each episode is five minutes long. The opening theme is "Voyager" by JAM Project.

Home release
Panda-Z is collected in six DVD volumes under Bandai Entertainment's "Anime Legends" banner, each of which also has a bonus 3-D animated short and a short featuring a large rotocast Panda-Z toy. The first volume is available with a pack-in Panda-Z toy 3" (8 cm) tall.

The series is currently streaming on Tubi.

References

External links
 
 
 

2004 anime television series debuts
Japanese children's animated action television series
Japanese children's animated comic science fiction television series
Bandai Entertainment anime titles
Comedy anime and manga
Television series about pandas
Animated television series about robots
Go Nagai